Sociedad Deportiva Textil Escudo is a football team based in Cabezón de la Sal in the autonomous community of Cantabria. Founded in 1925, the team plays in the Tercera División RFEF – Group 3. The club's home ground is Campo de Fútbol Juan María Parés Serra, which has a capacity of 1,500 spectators.

History

Club background
Escudo Club de Fútbol – (1949–1962)
Escudo Frente de Juventudes – (1962–1972)
Textil Escudo Frente de Juventudes – (1972–1977)
Sociedad Deportiva Textil Escudo – (1977–present)

Season to season

22 seasons in Tercera División

References

External links
Oficial web
Profile

Football clubs in Cantabria
Association football clubs established in 1949
1949 establishments in Spain